Community Christian Academy may refer to:

Community Christian Academy (Stuart, Florida)
Former name of Newstead Christian School